Melissa Deanne Holliday (born October 30, 1969) was Playboy magazine's Playmate of the Month for January 1995. Holliday also made an appearance on Baywatch that same year.

From June 26-July 12, 1995, she underwent ECT for depression at St. John's Hospital and Health Center in Santa Monica, California. She later sued the hospital and the doctors involved in a civil lawsuit over alleged medical malpractice, assault and battery, and personal injury. She has also claimed that: "I've been through a rape, and electroshock therapy is worse".

Holliday has sung at a Chrysler convention and done voice-overs for TV commercials.

See also
 List of people in Playboy 1990–1999

Notes

External links
 
 "WOMAN SAYS TRIAL DELAYS ARE UNFAIR CASE HAS BEEN CONTINUED 19 TIMES" from the Fort Lauderdale Sun Sentinel
 "SHE'S GETTING A LOT OF EXPOSURE" at the Rocky Mountain News
 "FALLEN STAR Hollywood dream takes nightmarish turn" at the Denver Post
 "Shock-therapy foes challenge medical community" at the Denver Post

1969 births
Living people
1990s Playboy Playmates
People from Greenwood, South Carolina